Douglas K. Hartman is an American scholar in the field of education. He is a professor of technology & human learning in the College of Education at Michigan State University.  He has a joint appointment in the Departments of Educational Psychology & Educational Technology and Teacher Education.  His research focuses on the use of digital technologies for human learning in a number of domains (e.g., school, work, community, sports, church and home).

Biography 
Hartman was born in Grangeville, Idaho. He was educated in Montana and Hawaii during his elementary and secondary school years. His college years were spent as a student-athlete in Oregon. He taught and coached at the middle school level in Oregon and California for several years before attending graduate school in Illinois. For nearly 30 years he's served as a faculty member at universities in Pennsylvania, Connecticut, and Michigan. With colleagues, Hartman has published almost 100 articles, chapters, and technical reports. His sole edited book, Stories Teachers Tell (with Richard Donato), was re-written as a reader's theater and performed off-Broadway in New York City. Hartman's current research interests focus on technologies and their use for human learning as well as the history of teaching & learning.

Education

Hartman earned his Ph.D. in 1991 at the University of Illinois, Urbana-Champaign, in Literacy, Language & Learning He worked as a research assistant at the University's Center for the Study of Reading with Rand J. Spiro, Richard C. Anderson, Diane Stephens, and Kathleen Copeland.

He received an M.Ed. in reading education from California State University, Fresno, in 1986 while working as an elementary teacher. In addition, he served as a research assistant in the School of Education and a teaching assistant in the Summer Bridge Program.

Hartman received his B.S. degree at Warner Pacific College in social science and reading in 1981 and began working as an English/language arts teacher for the West Orient Middle School in Gresham, Oregon.

Employment 
Hartman worked as an assistant and associate professor at University of Pittsburgh (1989-2004). He also served as a visiting assistant professor at University of California, Berkeley.

Hartman continued his research at University of Connecticut as a professor, research fellow, research scientist, and co-director of the New Literacies Research Lab (2004-2008). He also served as a visiting professor for the Teachers College at Columbia University.

He is currently professor in the College of Education at Michigan State University (2008–Present).

Research
Hartman research focus falls into three main categories: New Literacies and Intertextualities, Teacher Practices (including adolescent literacies) and the History of Literacy.

New Literacies and Intertextualities
Hartman has published in the areas of New Literacies and Intertextuality. This area of research has focused on the discussion of multiple texts and building sustainable cognition along with a transition to online reading. This area of research began through Dr. Hartman’s work on his Dissertation “Eight Readers Reading: The Intertextual Links of Able Readers Using Multiple Passages ” (winner of the International Reading Association’s Dissertation of the Year Award) and continues with his most recent, in print, publication “From Print to Pixels: The Evolution of Cognitive Conceptions of Reading Comprehension” (Hartman, Morsink, and Zheng, 2010).

Teacher Practices including Adolescent Literacies
Hartman’s research in the areas of Teacher Practices focused on the use of using multiple texts in the classroom, leading discussions in the classroom and shaping readers experiences through multiple texts. This area of research draws from the research in intertextualitiy but puts it into a practitioner lens for use by classroom teachers.

History of Literacy
Hartman research includes work on the history of literacy. He gave an address at the 57th Annual Meeting of the National Reading Conference on “One Hundred Years of Reading Research, 1908–2008” in 2007.

References

Living people
Warner Pacific University alumni
Year of birth missing (living people)
Place of birth missing (living people)
Michigan State University faculty
California State University, Fresno alumni
University of Illinois College of Education alumni
University of Pittsburgh faculty